The Miss Colombia pageant held its 65th edition under the name Rumbo a Miss Universo. It was held at the Club El Rodeo City Hall in Medellín, Colombia on September 30, 2018. This late edition was made in order to send a representative from Colombia to the Miss Universe 2018 pageant. 

At the end of the event, Laura González from Cartagena, D.T. and C. crowned Valeria Morales from Valle del Cauca as Señorita Colombia 2018. She represented Colombia at Miss Universe 2018 and was unplaced.

Results

Scores

Specials Awards

Delegates 
18 candidates were selected to compete in this edition.

References

External links
 Official website

2018 in Colombia
Miss Colombia
Colombia